The first Bengali theatre was established as early as 1795. Russian Indologist Gerasim Lebedev is credited to have founded it. Prasanna Kumar Tagore established the first Indian owned Bengali theatre in 1831, named the Hindu Theatre.

External links
 Modern Indian theatre

Bengali theatre
Culture of Kolkata
1795 establishments in India